George E. Hill (December 9, 1903 - November 1980) was an American politician from Maine. Hill, a Republican from South Portland, served in the Maine House of Representatives from 1933 to 1940. From 1937 to 1938, Hill was Speaker of the Maine House of Representatives.

References

1903 births
1980 deaths
Republican Party members of the Maine House of Representatives
Politicians from South Portland, Maine
Speakers of the Maine House of Representatives
20th-century American politicians